Ahmed Mefleh (born 18 January 1987) is a Saudi Arabian footballer who plays for Al-Maseef as a forward.

Career
He formerly played for Abha, Al-Ahli, Al-Fateh, Najran, Al-Taawoun, Al-Shoulla, Al-Hazem, again Abha, Al-Najma, again Abha, and Al-Maseef.

References

External links
 

1987 births
Living people
Saudi Arabian footballers
Association football forwards
Abha Club players
Al-Ahli Saudi FC players
Al-Fateh SC players
Najran SC players
Al-Taawoun FC players
Al-Shoulla FC players
Al-Hazem F.C. players
Al-Najma SC players
Al-Maseef SC players
Saudi Professional League players
Saudi First Division League players
Saudi Second Division players
Saudi Fourth Division players